Hrvatski ženski rukometni klub Grude, commonly referred to as HŽRK Grude or simply Grude, is a women's handball club from Grude, Bosnia and Herzegovina. HŽRK Grude competes in the Handball Championship of Bosnia and Herzegovina.

History
HŽRK Grude was founded in August 2009. The team played its first senior league game on 09.10.2010. in the First League of the Federation of Bosnia and Herzegovina (Second tier). In the 2013–14 season it was promoted to the top division.

Arena
The team plays its home games in Bili Brig Arena which has the capacity of around 2,000.

Honours

Domestic competitions

League
Handball Championship of Bosnia and Herzegovina: 
 Winners (6): 2015, 2016, 2017, 2018, 2019, 2020

First League of the Federation of Bosnia and Herzegovina: 
 Winners (1): 2013

Cups
Handball Cup of Bosnia and Herzegovina:
 Winners (4): : 2015, 2016, 2019, 2022

European record

Recent seasons
The recent season-by-season performance of the club:

Club ranking

EHF coefficient

EHF Club Ranking as of 13 July 2021:
 85  (78) TSV Bayer 04 Leverkusen (44)
 86  (79) HC Gomel (45)
 87  (92) HŽRK Grude (41)
 88  (81) OGC Nice Handball (43)

Team

Current squad
Squad for the 2016–17 season

Goalkeepers
  Ana Krizanac
  Andjela Milas

Wingers
  Matea Bandic
  Martina Kraljevic
  Andrea Prusina
Line Players 
  Anita Azinovic
  Tina Bandic

Back players
  Andjela Boras
  Josipa Bracic
  Nikolina Cutura
  Ana Kondza 
  Amanda Maric 
  Klara Mikulic
  Ana Nikic
  Lucina Zulj

References

External links
 Official website
 EHF Club profile

Bosnia and Herzegovina handball clubs
Handball clubs established in 2009
2009 establishments in Bosnia and Herzegovina
Croatian sports clubs outside Croatia